Aleksandr Konstantinovich Zakharov (born 11 March 1987) is a former Russian professional football player.

External links
 
 

1987 births
Footballers from Moscow
Living people
Russian footballers
Association football forwards
FC Neman Grodno players
Belarusian Premier League players
Russian expatriate footballers
Expatriate footballers in Belarus